Waynesboro is a city in Burke County, Georgia, United States. The population was 5,766 at the 2010 census. The city is the county seat of Burke County. It is part of the Augusta, Georgia metropolitan area.

Waynesboro is known as "The Bird Dog Capital of the World". The Waynesboro Commercial Historic District is listed on the National Register of Historic Places.

History
Waynesboro is located in Burke County, one of the eight original counties of Georgia. The city was named after General Anthony Wayne, whose daring efforts during the Revolutionary War earned him the nickname "Mad Anthony Wayne".

Although European Americans lived in the area before the Revolutionary War, the town was not laid out until 1783. The city was officially incorporated in 1883 as Waynesborough. The name was changed to Waynesboro sometime after. It developed as the trading and government center of the county, and is the site of the county courthouse and jail.

President George Washington spent the night of May 17, 1791, in Waynesboro. A stone monument on Liberty Street marks the historical site; it stands in front of the Golden Pantry (formerly Kwik Stop).

On December 4, 1864, the Civil War Battle of Waynesboro was fought just south of the town. Forces under Union General Judson Kilpatrick prevented troops led by Confederate General Joseph Wheeler from interfering with Union General William T. Sherman's campaign to destroy a wide swathe of the South on his march to Savannah, Georgia, and the Atlantic Ocean.

Geography
Waynesboro is located in the center of Burke County at  (33.090482, -82.015404). U.S. Route 25 bypasses the city on the east side, while State Route 121 passes through the center as Liberty Street.

Pine, oak, dogwood, and other trees found in the South are in Waynesboro.

Demographics

2020 census

As of the 2020 United States census, there were 5,799 people, 1,991 households, and 1,339 families residing in the city.

2010 census
As of the 2010 United States Census, there were 5,766 people living in the city. The racial makeup of the city was 70.4% Black, 25.9% White, <0.1% Native American, 0.4% Asian, 0.1% Pacific Islander, 0.1% from some other race and 1.0% from two or more races. 2.0% were Hispanic or Latino of any race.

2000 census
As of the census of 2000, there were 5,813 people, 2,151 households, and 1,473 families living in the city. The racial makeup of the city was 62.55% African American, 35.89% White,  0.10% Native American, 0.09% Asian, 0.41% from other races, and 0.96% from two or more races. Hispanic or Latino of any race were 1.20% of the population.

There were 2,151 households, out of which 37.4% had children under the age of 18 living with them, 32.1% were married couples living together, 32.7% had a female householder with no husband present, and 31.5% were non-families. 28.8% of all households were made up of individuals, and 14.5% had someone living alone who was 65 years of age or older. The average household size was 2.62 and the average family size was 3.21.

In the city, the population was spread out, with 33.3% under the age of 18, 10.0% from 18 to 24, 24.6% from 25 to 44, 17.9% from 45 to 64, and 14.2% who were 65 years of age or older. The median age was 31 years. For every 100 females, there were 78.8 males. For every 100 females age 18 and over, there were 69.8 males.

The median income for a household in the city was $20,346, and the median income for a family was $24,012. Males had a median income of $30,750 versus $19,462 for females. The per capita income for the city was $12,151. About 35.3% of families and 42.6% of the population were below the poverty line, including 60.6% of those under age 18 and 28.9% of those age 65 or over.

Economy

Nuclear power plant
On February 2, 2010, President Obama was expected to announce a total of $8.3 billion in federal loan guarantees to build and operate a pair of nuclear reactors in Burke County by Southern Company, an Atlanta-based energy company. The U.S. Department of Energy (DOE) offered Southern Company's subsidiary, Georgia Power, a conditional commitment for loan guarantees for the construction of the nation's first nuclear power units in more than 30 years. The conditional commitment is for loan guarantees that would apply to future borrowings related to the construction of Vogtle units 3 and 4.

Arts and culture
The Burke County Museum traces the area's history, from plantation life to the establishment of agribusiness.

Education

Burke County School District 
K-12 public education in Waynesboro is managed by Burke County Public Schools, with one high school, one middle school, two elementary/one primary school, and one alternative school and four private schools.
 SGA Elementary School (Pre k-5)
 Blakeney Elementary School (3-5)
 Waynesboro Primary School (pre K-2)
 Burke County Middle School (6-8)
 Burke County High School (9-12)
 Burke County Alternative School (6-12)
Private Schools
 Burke Haven Christian (K-8)
 Edmund Burke Academy (Pre K-12)
 Lord's House of Praise Christian (Pre K-11)
 Waynesboro Mennonite School (1-12)

Burke County Bears 
Waynesboro is the home to the Burke County Bears high school sports teams. The Bears won the 2011 state football championship against the Trojans of Peach County. Back in the 1950s, the former Waynesboro High School team, the Purple Hurricanes, won the state championship, but the Bears had not won a state championship football game until 2011.

Higher education 
Augusta Technical College, Waynesboro campus

Notable people

Jonathan Broxton, Major League Baseball player
Wycliffe Gordon, jazz trombonist
Cornelius Washington, NFL player
Robert Lee Scott, Jr., World War II fighter ace
Beau Jack, born Sidney Walker, Boxing World Champion Boxer

See also

 Central Savannah River Area

References

External links
 
 City of Waynesboro official website
 Waynesboro, Georgia, at City-Data.com
 Waynesborough historical marker
 Big Buckhead Church historical marker
 The Cavalry Actions at Waynesboro historical marker
 Washington's Southern Tour historical marker
 First Presbyterian Church historical marker

Cities in Georgia (U.S. state)
Cities in Burke County, Georgia
County seats in Georgia (U.S. state)
Augusta metropolitan area